Vaugondy Island is a mostly ice-covered island on the northeast side of Johannessen Harbour in the Pitt group of Biscoe Islands, Antarctica.  The feature extends 1.85 km in north-south direction and 1.68 km in east-west.

The island is named after the French cartographer Didier Robert de Vaugondy (1723-1786) who published a map of the south polar region in 1777.

Location

Vaugondy Island is located 2.78 km west-southwest of Trundle Island, 1.1 km northwest of Jingle Island, 2.08 km east of Animas Island and 3.4 km south of Ribnik Island.  British mapping in 1971.

Maps
 British Antarctic Territory: Graham Coast.  Scale 1:200000 topographic map.  DOS 610 Series, Sheet W 65 64.  Directorate of Overseas Surveys, UK, 1971.
 Antarctic Digital Database (ADD). Scale 1:250000 topographic map of Antarctica. Scientific Committee on Antarctic Research (SCAR). Since 1993, regularly upgraded and updated.

References
 Bulgarian Antarctic Gazetteer. Antarctic Place-names Commission. (details in Bulgarian, basic data in English)
 Vaugondy Island. SCAR Composite Antarctic Gazetteer.

External links
 Vaugondy Island. Copernix satellite image

Islands of the Biscoe Islands
Bulgaria and the Antarctic